Hacktivist is the debut extended play album by British rap metal band Hacktivist. It was released independently on 12 November 2012. Music videos for the songs "Cold Shoulders", "Unlike Us" and "Hacktivist" were released in support of the album.

A re-release of their debut EP with 4 bonus tracks including "Elevate" was released on 11 November 2013 via Wake to Reality/PIAS Recordings.

Track listing

Personnel
 Jermaine «J» Hurley – rapped vocals
 Ben Marvin – rapped vocals, unclean vocals
 Tim «Timfy James» Beazley – guitars, clean vocals, programming
 Josh Gurner – bass
 Richard Hawking – drums

References

2012 debut EPs
Hacktivist (band) albums
Rap metal EPs